David Kushnir (דוד קושניר; J21 June 1931 – 18 October 2020) was an Israeli Olympic long-jumper and track and field coach.

He was born in Afula, Mandatory Palestine (now in Israel), and was Jewish.

Track and field career
Kushnir won the gold medal in the broad jump (also known as the long jump) at the 1953 Maccabiah Games.

He competed for Israel at the 1956 Summer Olympics, at the age of 25, in Melbourne, Australia in the Men's Long Jump, jumped a distance of 6.89 meters, but did not qualify for the finals, and came in 25th.

Kushnir won the gold medal in the broad jump at the 1957 Maccabiah Games.

Kushnir also competed for Israel at the 1960 Summer Olympics, at the age of 29, in Rome, Italy, in the Men's Long Jump, jumped 7.20 meters, and came in 25th.

He won the Israeli Championship in the long jump in 1960, 1961, 1963, and 1964.  Kushnir coached the Israeli national track and field team from 1970 to 1982.  At the 1978 World Veterans Championship (age 40–45), Kushnir won the broad jump.

On top of being Israeli champion and national record holder in the long jump, Kushnir also won national championships in 100 metres, triple jump, and pole vault. He was the national record holder in triple jump (1954, 5 years) and decathlon (1954, 6 years).

Football career
Kushnir played football for Hapoel Balfouria while the club played at the top division, scoring goals for the club in matches against Maccabi Netanya and Hapoel Hadera during the 1954–55 season.

After retirement
After his retirement, Kushnir moved into track and field coaching. His most prominent trainee was long jumper and triple jumper Rogel Nachum.

References 

Athletes (track and field) at the 1956 Summer Olympics
Olympic athletes of Israel
People from Afula
Competitors at the 1957 Maccabiah Games
Maccabiah Games medalists in athletics
1931 births
2020 deaths
Israeli male long jumpers
Athletes (track and field) at the 1960 Summer Olympics
Competitors at the 1953 Maccabiah Games
Maccabiah Games gold medalists for Israel
Hapoel Balfouria F.C. players
Israeli Jews
Jewish male athletes (track and field)
Israeli athletics coaches
Association footballers not categorized by position
Israeli footballers
20th-century Israeli people